Swang may refer to:
Saang, popular folk theatre form, from India
Bhavai, variant of Swang theatre
Swang (song), single by rap duo Rae Sremmurd